Beilschmiedia membranacea is a species of plant in the family Lauraceae. It is a tree endemic to Peninsular Malaysia.  As of May 2017, it was classified as "vulnerable" by the IUCN Red List and is believed to be in Taman Negara

References

membranacea
Endemic flora of Peninsular Malaysia
Trees of Peninsular Malaysia
Vulnerable plants
Taxonomy articles created by Polbot